Navy Command is the current headquarters body of the Royal Navy, and as of 2012 its major organisational grouping. It is a hybrid, neither a command, nor simply an installation. Royal Navy official writings describe Navy Command Headquarters both as a physical site, on Whale Island, Hampshire, a collective formed of the most senior RN officers, and as a budgetary grouping.

On 1 April 2006 the Fleet Top Level Budget was established. A Top Level Budget (TLB) is the major financial accounting group of the MOD. On 1 April 2010 the Fleet TLB was renamed Navy Command. Navy Command is the Top Level Budget (holder) for the RN. Navy Command supports the First Sea Lord in the management of the Command, and delivers the Service's current and future outputs as articulated in the Command Plan.

History
The Royal Navy was historically divided into a number of fleets and ashore commands, prominent examples being the Home Fleet; Mediterranean Fleet; East Indies Station; and Far East Fleet. In the late 1960s the Home Fleet and Mediterranean Fleet were amalgamated into Western Fleet. In the 1970s Western Fleet and Far East Fleet were amalgamated into CINCFLEET. At the same time, the post of Commander-in-Chief, Plymouth was merged with that of Commander-in-Chief, Portsmouth to form Naval Home Command. As overseas bases continued to be reduced, the Navy's shore establishments became more concentrated in the UK, under Naval Home Command.

The purpose-built Headquarters at Whale Island, Portsmouth was opened in 2002 was named after Admiral of the Fleet Sir Henry Leach, the First Sea Lord during the Falklands War. 

As of 2017 official descriptions said that the headquarters was based at Whale Island, but also includes the Command Centre in Northwood, and support staff in Portsmouth Naval Base.
As of 2017 it included:
 Henry Leach Building and West Battery Building, HMS Excellent, Portsmouth – Senior Naval staff
 Moore Building, HMS Excellent – Fleet Battle Staff.
 Command Centre, Northwood – Maritime operations staff.
 HMNB Portsmouth: – Support Staff
 Maritime Warfare Centre
 Flag Officer Sea Training – training of warships for combat preparatory to deployments
 Royal Navy Chaplaincy Service – provision of religious ministry.

Structure 

The First Sea Lord and Chief of Naval Staff, is the Royal Navy's professional head and chairman of the Navy Board. He is responsible to the secretary of state for the fighting effectiveness, efficiency and morale of the Naval Service, and supports the Secretary of State for Defence in the management and direction of the Armed Forces.

The Fleet Commander exercises Full Command, on behalf of the First Sea Lord, over all Fleet Units, Battle Staffs, the Fleet Air Arm, Royal Fleet Auxiliary and the Royal Marines. He is responsible for the generation of units for tasking, and the operation of the Fleet in meeting standing commitments, conduct of current operations, and maintaining their contingent capability, as directed by Head Office and articulated in the Navy Command Plan.

The Second Sea Lord leads Navy Command HQ and is responsible for the Development and Delivery of future and current capability in support of the Fleet Commander, as detailed in the Navy Command Plan.

The previous office of the Assistant Chief of the Naval Staff (Submarines) and Deputy Flag Officer Scotland and Northern Ireland, as of January 2017, was disestablished under the Navy Command Transformation Programme, April 2020.

Changes by 2020-2021 saw the Commander, UK Strike Force, take up command of the UKSTRKFOR Enterprise, including the Maritime Battle Staff. ** The Maritime Battle Staff appears to be a change of name for the previous Fleet Battle Staff. The Fleet Battle Staff, based in two locations (Portsmouth and Plymouth), was the operational planning department, that planned exercises and operations for large multinational naval and marine task groups across the globe. But in actuality the Fleet Battle Staff was merely a collective name for the COMUKMARFOR, COMUKAMPHIBFOR, Commander UK Task Group (COMUKTG), and the 3 Commando Brigade Headquarters.

Office of the First Sea Lord and Chief of Naval Staff
Updated where possible to 2020-2021:
 First Sea Lord and Chief of Naval Staff – based at the Ministry of Defence in London as part of the Chiefs of the Defence Staff.
 Second Sea Lord and Deputy Chief of Naval Staff
 Fleet Commander
 Rear Admiral Iain Lower, Assistant Chief of the Naval Staff (Policy), directs and develops naval strategic policy and strategy for the Royal Navy.
 Commodore Paul S. Beattie, Director Naval Staff leads the Naval Staff Directorate in providing support to the First Sea Lord, ACNS (Policy) and the Navy Board; including the development of strategy and policy, and the delivery of strategic level engagement across Defence, including internationally. Beattie was posted in as of 26 May 2021.
 Head of Royal Navy Communications is the principal Navy Command advisor on RN communications and communications strategy.
 Naval Regional Commander Eastern England (NRC EE)
 Naval Regional Commander, Northern England (NRC NE)
 Naval Regional Commander, Wales & Western England (NRC WWE)
 Finance Director (Navy)

Second Sea Lord and Deputy Chief of Naval Staff 
Responsible for Chief of Staff HQ; 
 Chief Technical Officer; Chief Digital and Information Officer (all Commodores); 
 Director Force Generation, a Rear Admiral; 
 the three Naval Base Commanders; 
 Assistant Chief of Staff Support; 
 Assistant Chief of Staff Carrier Strike and Aviation; 
 Commanding Officer RNAS Yeovilton; 
 Deputy Director Maritime Warfare; 
 Assistant Chief of Staff Land and Deputy Commandant General Royal Marines; 
 Surface Flotilla; 
 Deputy Director/Assistant Chief of Staff Ships; 
 DDAS & Commodore Royal Fleet Auxiliary; 
 Director Develop; 
 Assistant Chief of Staff Maritime Capability; 
 Deputy Director Navy Capability Sponsor; 
 Director People and Training and Naval Secretary; 
 Deputy Director Navy Transformation (SCS1); 
 the Naval Assistant, Commodore Naval Legal Services (both Commodores); 
 Commander Maritime Reserves; 
 Assistant Chief of Staff Medical; reportedly ACOS Training/DFOST; 
  Deputy Director People; 
  Head of Nuclear Department (SCS1); 
  Director Navy Acquisition; 
 Assistant Chief of Staff Future Support and Engineering; 
  Type 26 Frigate Programme Director and Head of Ship Acquisition.

Fleet Commander
and subordinate senior officers

Director Navy Acquisition 
 Director Navy Acquisition

Assistant Chief of the Naval Staff (Capability)/Director Develop 
 Rear Admiral James Parkin, Assistant Chief of the Naval Staff (Capability)/Director Develop
 Assistant Chief of Staff Maritime Capability (COS Mar Cap)
 Deputy Director Navy Capability Sponsor

Director Naval (Support) 
 Director Naval (Support) (Assistant Chief of the Naval Staff (Support)) 
 Assistant Chief of Staff Logistics and Infrastructure, (COS Logs & Infra) 
 Assistant Chief of Staff Engineering Support (COS Eng Sup)

Director Force Generation 
Responsible for the Royal Navy’s Scheduling Authority, In-Service Capability Management, Intelligent Customer function and, discharging legislative Duty Holding Responsibilities/Risk to Life management.Director Force Generation’s Portfolio includes Deputy Director Ships, Deputy Director Submarines, Deputy Director Naval Aviation, Deputy Director Logistics, Deputy Director LS. Naval Bases Clyde, Devonport and Portsmouth; Air stations Yeovilton and Culdrose, AFSUP and Logistics policy and wider.
 Director Force Generation
 Assistant Chief of Staff Carrier Strike and Aviation
 Assistant Chief of Staff Land and Deputy Commandant General Royal Marines
 Commanding Officer Royal Naval Air Station Yeovilton
 Commanding Officer, Culdrose
 Naval Base Commander, Portsmouth 
 Naval Base Commander, Clyde
 Naval Base Commander, Devonport

Director People and Training and Naval Secretary 
 Director People and Training and Naval Secretary (Assistant Chief of the Naval Staff (Personnel) merged into post of DP&T)
 Naval Assistant (Previously titled Naval Assistant to the Naval Secretary)
 Surgeon-Commodore Fleur Marshall, Assistant Chief of Staff (Medical), Navy Command, Head of the Royal Navy Medical Service. Marshall was in post as of 26 February 2019
 Commodore Naval Legal Services
 Deputy Director People
 Commander Maritime Reserves
 Deputy Director Future Training, formerly known as Assistant Chief of Staff Training/Deputy Flag Officer, Sea Training, also formerly had the separate post of Commander Core Naval Training. 
 Commanding Officer Maritime Warfare School - under a Navy captain, not a Commodore. Commanding Officer Operational Training, (COM OT) replaced by Commander Fleet Operational Sea Training.

Fleet Commander

Chaplain of the Fleet 
 Chaplain of the Fleet

Commander Operations 
 Commander Operations
 Deputy Commander Operations, a Commodore responsible for ensuring the Royal Navy has the ability to observe and process all aspects of operational experience to learn lessons from previous operations and enhance fighting power.
 Commander Surface Flotilla – merger of Commander Portsmouth Flotilla (COMPORFLOT) and Commander Devonport Flotilla, (COMDEVFLOT)  
 Commander Submarine Flotilla

Commander United Kingdom Strike Force 
 Commander United Kingdom Strike Force (COMUKSTRKFOR or CSF)
 Commander Littoral Strike Group
 Commander United Kingdom Carrier Strike Group and Deputy Commander UK Maritime Forces
 Assistant Chief of Staff, Maritime Warfare (this function did supervise the Maritime Warfare Centre). Responsible for the setting, maintenance and monitoring of warfighting standards, policy and operational capability.
 Commander 3 Commando Brigade Royal Marines
 Commander Fleet Operational Sea Training

Finance Director Navy 
 Finance Director (Navy) is the chief financial officer of Navy Command's delegated budget and superintends the Command Secretariat, under the First Sea Lord & CNS.

Assistant Chief of Staff Resources and Plans 
 The Assistant Chief of Staff Resources and Plans supports the Finance Director Navy in delivering financial objectives and adhering to the framework of legal, political, financial and regulatory authorities.

Command Secretary 
 The Command Secretary is the senior civilian in Navy Command Headquarters responsible for civilian personnel, external accountability, resource management and certain aspects of planning.

Deputy Finance Director, Navy 
 The Deputy Finance Director is responsible overall financially managing Navy Command and the head of the Navy Command Finance department.

Head of Navy Effectiveness and Strategy 
 The Head of Navy Effectiveness and Strategy  superintends multidisciplinary project teams, specializing in policy, commercial and financial expertise he reports back to both the (FD(N) and ACNS(Pol).

Notes

References 
  
 Government, H.M. "The Navy List" (PDF). royalnavy.mod.uk. H.M. Stationery Office, January 2017.
 
 
 
  The current appointment of Commodore Ahlgren is Deputy Commander Operations.
 
 Royal Navy, "Navy Command HQ, Royal Navy". royalnavy.mod.uk. Royal Navy. Retrieved 7 August 2017.

Further reading 
 Grove. D. Philip and Redford. Duncan. (2014). "The Royal Navy: A History Since 1900". I.B.Tauris. IBAN: 9780857735072.

External links
 Navy Command Headquarters Website

 

Military headquarters in the United Kingdom
Organisations based in Portsmouth
Royal Navy shore establishments
Naval headquarters